Honeycomb is the tenth studio album by American alternative rock musician Frank Black, released in July 2005 on Back Porch Records. His first original solo work since 1996's The Cult of Ray, Honeycomb was recorded in Nashville, and features notable local session musicians, such as Steve Cropper and ex-Presley guitarist Reggie Young.

Background
Frank Black had discussed making a Black on Blonde record for about ten years with producer Jon Tiven, where he would travel to Nashville (like Dylan with Blonde on Blonde) and record with local musicians. In 2005, Black eventually found the time to record such an album. He went to Nashville and met with musicians whom Tiven had selected for the record. Black said, "I knew he'd ask all stellar people, though I had no idea it was going to be guys like Steve Cropper. They were challenged... well, more amused than challenged. I don't think it was hard for them, but they had to think a little bit."

Covers
Unusually for a Frank Black album, it has 3 cover songs: "Song of the Shrimp," "Sunday Sunny Mill Valley Groove Day" (by Doug Sahm) and "Dark End of the Street". Black said that, for the cover of "Song of the Shrimp," he took his cue from the version by Townes Van Zandt, adding that he had never heard Elvis Presley's version.

Track listing

Personnel
Credits adapted from the album's liner notes.
Musicians
Frank Black – vocals, guitar
Steve Cropper – guitar
Buddy Miller – guitar
Reggie Young – guitar
Spooner Oldham – keyboards, bells, vocals
David Hood – bass guitar
Billy Block – drums
Anton Fig – drums
Akil Thompson – drums
Chester Thompson – drums
Jean Black – duet vocal (8)
James Griffin – vocals
Ellis Hooks – vocals
Dan Penn – vocals
Jon Tiven – harmonica
Technical
Jon Tiven – producer, additional mixing
Dann Penn – engineer, additional mixing
Ben Mumphrey – additional engineer
Earl Drake – mixing
Jim DeMain – mastering
Elizabeth Parr – cover art
Violet Clark – package design
Nora Hagerty – package layout

References

2005 albums
Black Francis albums